Battle of Bratačića (Serbian Cyrillic:  Битка код Братачића) took place on 1 August 1806 between Serbs and Turks. The battle was part of the First Serbian Uprising and ended with the victory of the Serbs.

Battle
At the beginning of the Turkish offensive against Karađorđe's Serbia in 1806, the Turkish army under the Srebrenica commander Hadži-beg, with a strength of 7,000 men, crossed the Drina and from Sokograd, through the Valjevo nahiya, attacked Palež (Obrenovac) to merge with the main Bosniak army on the way to Belgrade. At the end of July, the Turks stopped in Bratačić on 1 August while the suppressed insurgents of the Valjevo nahiya remained in the village of Osecina. Karađorđe intended to first defeat the Turks under Hadzi-beg, and then defeat the main Turkish army from Bosnia, which was gathering near Šabac to attack Mišar. Because of that, Karađorđe kept 300-400 insurgents in Kličevac, and sent most of them to Osecina. The strength of the Serbian forces was 1,500 infantry with 2 cannons and 200 horsemen. The Turks attacked the Serbs on the same day, but seeing that they were supported by 60 cavalrymen under the command of Matija Nenadović, retreated after the first attack. The Turks thought that larger reinforcements were coming to the Serbs, so they withdrew to Bratačić. On the same day, the Serbs occupied the layout on the slopes around Bratačić and attacked the Turks, who retreated towards Rožanj at night and further towards the Drina. Thus, the direction from Valjevo to Obrenovac was safe for Karađorđe for the upcoming Battle of Mišar.

See more
 Battle of Mišar
 List of Serbian Revolutionaries

References
 

1800s battles
Conflicts in 1806
First Serbian Uprising
1800s in Serbia
Serbia–Turkey relations